Selston is a large village and civil parish approximately 12 miles (19.3 km) NNW of Nottingham in the Ashfield district, Nottinghamshire, England.

At the time of the 2001 census Selston Parish (which includes the settlements of Underwood, Jacksdale, Westwood, Bagthorpe, New Selston and Selston proper) had a population of 12,208 increasing to 12,596 at the 2011 Census.

Selston is bounded by Underwood to the South, Annesley to the East, and the Derbyshire border to the West. St Helen's Church dates back to 1150 AD although the exterior of the church was altered by restoration and enlargement in 1899. An older Saxon church is thought to have occupied the site, and there is a monolith in the church yard, which may have been of ceremonial importance for pre-Christian pagans. The village is part of Nottinghamshire's Hidden Valleys area.

Ordnance Survey Maps: Explorer 269 (Chesterfield and Alfreton) and Landranger 120 (Sherwood Forest). Selston Grid Reference 45781,52881.

The local five-a-side football pitch, on the site of the Leisure Centre, was opened by Nottingham Forest legends, Stuart Pearce and Colin Cooper.

Since the year 2000 new housing estates have been built in Selston as more families requested to live in the area. The last trace of the Holland Family, responsible for the building of Matthew Holland School in Selston, was removed when David Holland, great grandson of Matthew, sold his greengrocer's shop. It was demolished in 2005.

In 2006 the Matthew Holland School, having become a specialist school with Visual Arts status, changed its name to the Selston Arts and Community College, and then again a few years later to Selston High School, though remaining a comprehensive school.

One notable resident of Selston was Stephen Cox Wood Sr, who was born in the village in 1873 before his emigration to Canada as a young man. 
Wood's great-great-grandchildren are the American singers and songwriters Finneas O'Connell and Billie O'Connell (best known by her stage name Billie Eilish).

References

External links

Your local church for Jacksdale and Selston is Jacksdale and Selston Community Church. The web site is jacksdaleandselstoncommunitychurch.com . The church is Pastored by Ryan Clarke along with a team of 5 other elders. 

Villages in Nottinghamshire
Ashfield District